The 2005 All-Ireland Under-21 Hurling Championship was the 42nd staging of the All-Ireland Under-21 Hurling Championship, the Gaelic Athletic Association's premier inter-county hurling tournament for players under the age of twenty-one. The championship began on 31 May 2005 and ended on 18 September 2005.

Kilkenny were the defending champions.

On 18 September 2005, Galway won the championship following a 1-15 to 1-14 defeat of Kilkenny in the All-Ireland final. This was their 8th All-Ireland title and their first since 1996.

Results

Leinster Under-21 Hurling Championship

Quarter-final

Semi-finals

Final

Munster Under-21 Hurling Championship

Quarter-finals

Semi-finals

Final

Ulster Under-21 Hurling Championship

Semi-final

Final

All-Ireland Under-21 Hurling Championship

Semi-finals

Final

Scoring statistics

Top scorers overall

Top scorers in a single game

References

Under-21
All-Ireland Under-21 Hurling Championship